Aubrey Herbert Sperry (June 29, 1878 – March 24, 1942) was a merchant and political figure in Nova Scotia, Canada. He represented Lunenburg County in the Nova Scotia House of Assembly from 1920 to 1925 as a Liberal member.

Early life and education
He was born in Petite-Rivière, Nova Scotia, the son of John Drew Sperry and Maria Louisa Dauphinee and was educated at Mount Allison Academy.

Career
He was clerk and treasurer for Lunenburg.

Death
He died in Halifax at the age of 68.

Personal life
Sperry was married twice: to Mary P. Coffin in 1903 and then to Margaret H Pickels.

References 

 

1878 births
1942 deaths
Nova Scotia Liberal Party MLAs